Patrick J. Finglass is a British classicist of Ancient Greek literature and the Henry Overton Wills Professor of Greek at the University of Bristol and former Fifty-Pound Fellow at All Souls College Oxford. His field of research includes Greek lyric poetry and Greek tragedy, with a particular interest in the authors Sophocles, Euripides, Pindar, and Stesichorus. He is a current editor of The Classical Quarterly, and has penned numerous articles and critical editions of Greek texts with extensive commentary.

Selected published works

2021 - The Cambridge Companion to Sappho (Cambridge, with Adrian Kelly)
2020 - Female Characters in Fragmentary Greek Tragedy (Cambridge, with Lyndsay Coo)
2019 - Sophocles (Cambridge)
2018 - Sophocles: Oedipus the King (Cambridge Classical Texts and Commentaries)
2015 - Stesichorus in Context (Cambridge, with Adrian Kelly)
2014 - Stesichorus: The Poems (Cambridge Classical Texts and Commentaries, with Malcolm Davies)
2011 - Sophocles: Ajax (Cambridge Classical Texts and Commentaries)
2007 - Sophocles: Electra (Cambridge Classical Texts and Commentaries)

References

External links
 Author archive at OUP
 The Cambridge Companion to Sappho
 Female Characters in Fragmentary Greek Tragedy
 Sophocles
 Sophocles: Oedipus and the King
 Stesichorus in context
 Stesichorus: The poems
 Sophocles: Ajax
 Sophocles: Electra

Living people
British classical scholars
Academics of the University of Bristol
Fellows of All Souls College, Oxford
Year of birth missing (living people)